Rovte is a settlement in the Rovte Hills north of Logatec in the Inner Carniola region of Slovenia.

Church
The parish church in the settlement is dedicated to Saint Michael and belongs to the Ljubljana Archdiocese.

Gallery

References

External links

Rovte on Geopedia

Populated places in the Municipality of Logatec